Dr. John Grove House and Office was a historic home and office located at Liberty, Union County, Indiana.  It was built in 1885, and consisted of a two-story, rectangular store front section with an attached two-story residence of frame construction sheathed in clapboard.  The complex was in the Italianate / Gothic Revival style.

It was listed on the National Register of Historic Places in 1982 and delisted in 1985.

References

Former National Register of Historic Places in Indiana
Houses on the National Register of Historic Places in Indiana
Gothic Revival architecture in Indiana
Italianate architecture in Indiana
Houses completed in 1885
Buildings and structures in Union County, Indiana
National Register of Historic Places in Union County, Indiana